Mr. Gay Canada is a Canadian English language documentary television series. Mr. Gay Canada premiered on March 23, 2009 at 8:30 p.m. EST on the Canadian specialty channel, OUTtv.

Premise
Mr. Gay Canada is a two-part documentary television series that follows a group of gay men who have entered the Mr. Gay Canada competition. The series takes a behind the scenes look at the competition through the eyes of the winner, Darren Bruce, who narrates the series.

External links
 Mr. Gay Canada competition

OutTV (Canadian TV channel) original programming
2009 Canadian television series debuts
2000s Canadian documentary television series
2000s Canadian LGBT-related television series
Mr Gay World